Mathew Nicholls (born 1977) is an Australian rules football field umpire in the Australian Football League.

At the end of 2013, Nicholls had umpired 202 career games in the AFL. He officiated in the 2013 AFL Grand Final and the 2014 AFL Grand Final.

Nicholls is also notably referred to as "the best bouncer in the business", by commentator Brian Taylor, a reference to his ability to produce a large centre bounce.

References

Australian Football League umpires
Living people
1977 births